Patrick Tilden "Pat" Close (June 1, 1948 – February 15, 1988) was a former American child actor who later appeared in the 1967 Andy Warhol film, Imitation of Christ.

Career
Close began his career at the age of 11 when he was discovered while appearing in a stage production of Auntie Mame in Hollywood. He made his film debut as a young Elliot Roosevelt in 1960 in the biographical film Sunrise at Campobello. For the remainder of the decade, he guest starred on various television series. Close continued his acting career in his late teenage years from 1967 to 1970 as one of Andy Warhol's film stars. He played the lead role of "The Son" in the 1967 Warhol film Imitation of Christ.  There was speculation at the time that Close would have become a new James Dean if Warhol had released the film into general distribution instead of allowing only a single premiere presentation.  Other reviews, however, disagreed, saying he was "awkward" and "unprofessional."

Close continued to work with Warhol after 1970, not so much as an actor in Warhol's films, but more as a contributor to such projects as Andy Warhol's Interview magazine.

After 1980, he continued acting in movies, credited as Patrick Close, in minor roles for such low-budget productions as Roger Corman's Space Raiders (1983).

Death
On February 15, 1988, Close died of "fatty metamorphosis of the liver" at the age of 39. The coroner's report indicated that Close's death was due to alcoholism.

Filmography

References

External links 
 

1948 births
1988 deaths
20th-century American male actors
Alcohol-related deaths in California
American male child actors
American male film actors
American male stage actors
American male television actors
Deaths from liver disease